Rosales, officially the Municipality of Rosales,  is a 1st class municipality in the province of Pangasinan, Philippines. According to the 2020 census, it has a population of 66,711 people.

It is sometimes called Carmen, based on its prominent barangay of the same name (now split into two barangays). Rosales was created as a separate municipality through a Royal Decree in 1852.  It was named in honor of Don Antonio Rosales.

Philippine National Author and internationally renowned novelist Francisco Sionil Josè has set a monument to the town he grew up in with his five-novels-series The Rosales Saga. The town itself is dotted with ancestral houses and heritage structures deemed important cultural sites via the National Cultural Heritage Act.

Rosales is a junction town for those travelling between the provinces of Tarlac and Nueva Ecija to the other towns of Pangasinan. It is accessible via Tarlac–Pangasinan–La Union Expressway (TPLEX), or via the MacArthur Highway.

Etymology
It is widely believed that the name Rosales came from the word rosal which is a name of a flower that was known to be abundant in the area. However, Spanish records revealed that Rosales was originally a ranchera founded by a pioneering Filipino named Nicolas Bañez. It was declared a pueblo in 1852. The place was named in honor of Don Antonio Rosales Liberal, a man noted for his rectitude, industry, and learning. He is also an Order of the Royal Audiencia in Manila and a Consejero de Filipinas en el Ministro de Ultramar (Secretary of Foreign Affairs) during that time.

History

Geography 

Barangays
Rosales is politically subdivided into 37 barangays. These barangays are headed by elected officials: Barangay Captain, Barangay Council, whose members are called Barangay Councilors. All are elected every three years.

Climate

Demographics

Economy

Livelihood and products
Chopping Board Industry (Acop) 
Charcoal (Acop)
Tupig & Tinapa (Smoked Fish) (Carmen)
Patupat (Balincanaway)
Rice/Palay Producer

Government

Rosales, belonging to the sixth congressional district of the province of Pangasinan, is governed by a mayor designated as its local chief executive and by a municipal council as its legislative body in accordance with the Local Government Code. The mayor, vice mayor, and the councilors are elected directly by the people through an election which is being held every three years.

Elected officials

Presidencia

The Presidencia (Town hall) is located in front of the Robert B. Estrella Stadium, Poblacion. In 1924, the construction of the Presidencia building (Municipal Town Hall) was completed and became the seat of the municipal government. The heritage building was renovated in 2004-2007 under the administration of Mayor Ricardo V. Revita with his Revitalize Rosales banner.

Landmarks

Robert B. Estrella Stadium
Ramon Magsaysay Monument
Tomb of The Unknown Soldiers
Presidencia

Nature and Adventure
Acop Dam
Salvacion and San Miguel Dam
Acop Cold Springs and Waterfall
Rosales Aviary/Mini Zoo
Eco-Tourism Site of Rosales
Ibtor Challenge (Sports) Festival of Rosales

St. Anthony of Padua Parish Church
St. Anthony of Padua Parish Church is part of the Roman Catholic Diocese of Urdaneta (Roman Catholic Archdiocese of Lingayen-Dagupan), at Rosales. Through a decree of the Vicar-General of the Archbishopric Authority of Manila, the Catholic Church was restored on February 15, 1915. A modest shed-like barong-barung was built at the present site of the church. Fr. Nicasio Mabanta was the first Parish Priest.

Within 3 years, a much sturdier building with GI sheets as roofing and sawali walls was constructed. Father Antonio Salindong was assigned, with longest tenure ever, continued the improvement with construction of concrete wall and facade with the image of St. Anthony. In 1946, a strong tornado tore off the GI sheet roof of the Church. Conrado Estrella, Sr. restored the roof with donations of the residents.

During the term of Fr. Primo Garcia (1979-1986), the church was expanded in its east and west wings, the beginning of the construction of the parish center, and fencing of the whole premises. Msgr. Geronimo Marcelino begun the renovations of the Parish Rectory and completed by Fr. Diomedes Laguerta.

Our Lady of Rosales Grotto
The Grotto, which is located at Station District, is regularly visited by President Gloria Macapagal Arroyo (for spiritual atonement and guidance) and local and foreign tourists.

Ancient dugout

A centuries-old unfinished dugout, a big banca (five tons, measuring 8 by 2 by 1.5 meters), was accidentally retrieved in November 2010 by Mayor Ricardo Revita at Barangay Casanicolasan in the Lagasit River, near the Agno River. It was display in front of the Presidencia or Municipal Town Hall but later remove during renovation of Presidencia (town hall).

Notable personalities
Carmen Rosales - Filipino actress and World War II guerilla fighter. 2 barangays were named after her. 
Francisco Sionil Josè - National Artist of the Philippines for Literature and internationally renowned novelist

Sister towns
Rosales currently has no legally-declared townhood/cityhood relationships, however, it has good economic and tourist ties with Guimba, Nueva Ecija and Cuyapo, Nueva Ecija.

Gallery

References

External links

 Rosales Profile at PhilAtlas.com
 Municipal Profile at the National Competitiveness Council of the Philippines
 Rosales at the Pangasinan Government Website
 Local Governance Performance Management System
 [ Philippine Standard Geographic Code]
 Philippine Census Information

Municipalities of Pangasinan
Populated places on the Agno River